Woorndoo is a town in the Western District of Victoria, Australia. The population of the town proper is around 50.

Woorndoo Post Office opened on 15 June 1866 and closed in 1996. A Post Office at Woorndoo Upper opened around 1902 and closed in 1946.

The town in conjunction with neighbouring township Mortlake has an Australian Rules football team Woorndoo-Mortlake competing in the Mininera & District Football League.

Traditional ownership
The formally recognised traditional owners for the area in which Woorndoo sits are the Eastern Maar people, who are represented by the Eastern Maar Aboriginal Corporation.

References

Towns in Victoria (Australia)